The 2012 United States House of Representatives elections in Maryland were held on Tuesday, November 6, 2012 to elect the eight U.S. representatives from the state of Maryland, one from each of the state's eight congressional districts. The elections coincided with the elections of other federal and state offices, including the quadrennial presidential election and an election to the U.S. Senate.

The new congressional map, drawn and passed by the Democratic-controlled Maryland General Assembly, was signed into law by Governor Martin O'Malley on October 20, 2011.  The map made the 6th district, at that time represented by Republican Roscoe Bartlett, much more favorable to Democrats.

Overview

District 1
The redrawn 1st district includes Caroline, Cecil, Dorchester, Kent, Queen Anne's, Somerset, Talbot, Wicomico, and Worcester counties, as well as parts of Baltimore, Carroll, and Harford counties.  Republican incumbent Andy Harris, who had been first elected in 2010, ran for re-election.

Republican primary

Candidates

Nominee
Andy Harris, incumbent U.S. Representative

Primary results

Democratic primary

Candidates

Nominee
 Wendy Rosen, businesswoman

Eliminated in primary
 John LaFerla, OB/GYN physician and former president of the Kent County Democratic Central Committee
 Kimberley Letke, businesswoman

Declined
Frank Kratovil, former U.S. Representative

Primary results

Libertarian primary

Nominee 
Muir Boda, asset protection manager

General election

Campaign
After Rosen won the primary, she was forced to withdrew from the race on September 10, 2012, after evidence surfaced that she'd voted in both Maryland and Florida in the 2006 and 2008 elections. Rosen had property in Florida, and Maryland law allowed property owners to vote in local elections even if they live elsewhere. However, her Florida voting registration reportedly also gave her access to state and federal elections there, something which was not allowed by Maryland law. As the deadline for replacing a candidate on the general election ballot was August 28, members of the Democratic Central Committees of each county in the district had to choose a write-in candidate to run in November. Two potential candidates who indicated an interest were former U.S. Representative Wayne Gilchrest, who represented the 1st district as a Republican from 1991 to 2009, and LaFerla, who finished a close second in the primary. LaFerla was then endorsed as the Democratic write-in candidate.

Results

District 2
The redrawn 2nd district includes parts of Anne Arundel, Baltimore, Harford, and Howard counties, and parts of the city of Baltimore.  Democrat Dutch Ruppersberger, who had represented the 2nd district since 2003, ran for re-election.

Democratic primary

Candidates

Nominee
Dutch Ruppersberger, incumbent U.S. Representative

Primary results

Republican primary

Candidates

Nominee
 Nancy Jacobs, State Senator

Eliminated in primary
 Ray Bly, veteran
 Vladmir Degen 
 Richard Impallaria, state delegate 
 Howard Orton 
 Larry Smith, former aide to U.S. Representative Andy Harris

Declined
Pat McDonough, state delegate

Primary results

Libertarian primary

Nominee 
Leo Dymowski, Army veteran and attorney

General election

Results

District 3
The redrawn 3rd district includes parts of Anne Arundel, Baltimore, Howard, and Montgomery counties, and parts of the city of Baltimore.  Democrat John Sarbanes, who had represented the 3rd district since 2007, ran for re-election.

Democratic primary

Candidates

Nominee
 John Sarbanes, incumbent U.S. Representative

Eliminated in primary
 Dave Lockwood, management consultant

Primary results

Republican primary

Candidates

Nominee
 Eric Delano Knowles, bartender and Constitution Party nominee for Governor for 2010

Eliminated in primary
 Armand Girard, retired teacher 
 Thomas E. "Pinkston" Harris, nominee for this seat in 2008 and candidate for in 2010
 Draper Phelps,

Primary results

Libertarian primary

Candidates

Nominee
Paul Drgos Jr, computer programmer

General election

Results

District 4
The redrawn 4th district includes parts of Anne Arundel and Prince George's counties.  Democrat Donna Edwards, who has represented the 4th district since 2008, ran for re-election.

Democratic primary

Candidates

Nominee
 Donna Edwards, incumbent U.S. Representative

Eliminated in primary
 Ian Garner, U.S. Navy veteran
 George McDermott, entrepreneur

Withdrawn
 Glenn Ivey, former Prince George's County State's Attorney

Declined
 Jaime Benoit, Anne Arundel County councilman

Primary results

Republican primary

Candidates

Nominee
Faith Loudon

Eliminated in primary
Randy Gearhart
Greg Holmes
Charles Shepherd

Primary results

Libertarian primary

Candidates

Nominee
Scott Soffen

General election

Results

District 5
The redrawn 5th district includes Calvert, Charles, and St. Mary's counties, as well as parts of Anne Arundel and Prince George's counties.  Democrat Steny Hoyer, who has represented the 5th district since 1981, ran from re-election

Democratic primary

Candidates

Nominee
 Steny Hoyer, incumbent U.S. Representative

Eliminated in primary
 Cathy Johnson Pendleton, publishing company founder

Primary results

Republican primary

Candidates

Nominee
 Tony O'Donnell, Minority Leader of the Maryland House of Delegates

Eliminated in primary
 David Hill, motorcycle technician 
 Glenn Troy Morton, author

Declined
 Charles Lollar, nominee for this seat in 2010

Primary results

Libertarian primary

Candidates

Nominee
Arvin Vohra, aeducator and entrepreneur

Green primary

Candidates

Nominee
Bob Auerbach

General election
Jeremy Stinson, an unaffiliated candidate, did not secure a ballot nomination and ran as a write-in candidate.

Results

District 6
The redrawn 6th district includes Allegany, Garrett, and Washington counties, as well as parts of Frederick and Montgomery counties.  Republican Roscoe Bartlett, who had represented the 6th district since 1993, ran for re-election.

Republican primary

Candidates

Nominee
 Roscoe Bartlett, incumbent U.S. Representative

Eliminated in primary
 Kathy Afzali, state delegate
 David R. Brinkley, state senator 
 Robert Coblentz, systems analyst for the American Public University System and vice president of the Washington County Republican Club 
 Robin Ficker, former state delegate and perennial candidate 
 Peter James, farmer and nominee for the 4th district in 2008 
 Joseph Krysztoforski, retired entrepreneur
 Brandon Rippeon, businessman

Declined
 Alex X. Mooney, chairman of the Maryland Republican Party and former state senator 
 Bud Otis, Rep. Bartlett's former chief of staff 
 Christopher B. Shank, state senator

Endorsements

Primary results

Democratic primary

Candidates

Nominee
 John Delaney, commercial banker

Eliminated in primary
 Charles Bailey 
 Robert J. Garagiola, state senator 
 Ron Little, member of the Montgomery County Board of Social Services 
 Milad Pooran, doctor and Air Force veteran

Withdrawn
 Duchy Trachtenberg, former member of the Montgomery County Council

Declined
 Mark Shriver, state delegate 
 Doug Duncan, former Montgomery County Executive

Endorsements

Primary results

Libertarian primary

Candidates

Nominee
Nickolaus Mueller

General election

Campaign
Facing a district that had been significantly redrawn to favour the Democrats (going from a seat that McCain carried with 57%, Obama would have carried the redrawn seat with 56%) the Bartlett campaign faced further diffcultlies when the Federal Elections Commission fined Bartlett $5,000 for repeatedly failing to submit accurate campaign finance disclosure reports.

When Todd Akin made his controversial comments about female biology, Bartlett immediately repudiated them, adding "There is no room in politics for these types of statements...As a human physiologist I know there is no scientific backing to Todd's claims." He followed it up with reiterating that his view on abortion exceptions has been "the same for twenty years. I'm pro-life, with exceptions for the life of the mother, rape and incest...I'm so avidly pro-life I'm against corporal punishment"

However, it later transpired in 2001 Bartlett had supported a constitutional amendment which did not include the rape and incest exceptions.

Endorsements

Polling

Predictions

Results

District 7
The redrawn 7th district includes parts of Baltimore and Howard counties, and parts of the city of Baltimore.  Democrat Elijah Cummings, who had represented the 7th district since 1996, ran for re-election.

Democratic primary

Candidates

Nominee
Elijah Cummings, incumbent U.S. Representative

Eliminated in primary
Ty Busch
Charles Smith

Primary results

Republican primary

Candidates

Nominee
Frank Mirabile

Eliminated in primary
Justin Kinsey

Primary results

Libertarian primary

Candidates

Nominee
Ronald Owens-Bey

General election

Results

District 8
The redrawn 8th district will include parts of Carroll, Frederick, and Montgomery counties.  Democrat Chris Van Hollen, who had represented the 8th district since 2003, ran for re-election.

Democratic primary

Candidates

Nominee
 Chris Van Hollen, incumbent

Eliminated in primary
 George English, retired economist

Primary results

Republican primary

Candidates

Nominee
 Kenneth Timmerman, author and reporter

Eliminated in primary
 Gus Alzona, accountant
 Shelly Skolnick, attorney
 Dave Wallace, businessman

Primary results

Libertarian primary

Candidates

Nominee
Mark Grannis, attorney

Green primary

Candidates

Nominee
George Gluck, computer consultant

General election

Results

References

External links
 Maryland State Board of Elections
 United States House of Representatives elections in Maryland, 2012 at Ballotpedia
 Maryland U.S. House at OurCampaigns.com
 Campaign contributions for U.S. Congressional races in Maryland at OpenSecrets
 Outside spending at the Sunlight Foundation

United States House of Representatives
2012
Maryland